Charles Gordon O'Neill (23 March 1828 – 8 November 1900) was a Scottish-Australasian civil engineer, inventor, parliamentarian and philanthropist, and a co-founder of the St Vincent de Paul Society in Australia and New Zealand.

Biography
He was born in Glasgow, son of John O'Neill, hotel proprietor, and his wife Mary. O'Neill studied civil engineering and mechanics at the University of Glasgow. He worked on the city's public works for 14 years, rising to become chief assistant in the Public Works Office. Although a full-time official he appears to have had permission to undertake private work for the Roman Catholic community, designing churches and schools. He served as a captain in the Third Lanarkshire Rifle Volunteers, and was active in the Society of St Vincent de Paul, becoming secretary at Dumbarton (1851), president of the Superior Council of Glasgow (1863), and a member of the Council General in Paris. He emigrated to New Zealand in 1864.

In January he became 1864 to the Otago provincial government and later district engineer at Clutha, where he laid out the town of Milton.

Political career

 
 

He arrived in Otago in January 1864, where he was a Member of Parliament for the Goldfields electorate in the Otago region (elected on 26 February 1866 during the 1866 general election; dissolution of the 4th New Zealand Parliament on 30 December 1870), and then for the Thames electorate (elected on 9 February 1871 during the 1871 general election; dissolution of the 5th New Zealand Parliament on 6 December 1875).

Philanthropy
O'Neill led the St Vincent de Paul Society in the Western Districts of Scotland between 1859 and 1863. After emigrating to New Zealand, he was active in the Society of St Vincent de Paul and in 1876 founded its first conference to be aggregated in New Zealand in Wellington. At the request of Society's President-General Adolphe Baudon (1819–88), successfully established the Society in New South Wales, Australia, beginning with St Patrick's Church Hill Conference. The Conference celebrated its 125th anniversary in 2006. A second conference was established at St Francis's, Haymarket.

Later life and death
He moved to Australia in 1881, where he practised as an architect and engineer. He died in Sydney at the age of 72, on 8 November 1900.

References

Captain Charles, engineer of charity: the remarkable life of Charles Gordon O'Neill by Stephen Utick (2008, Allen & Unwin, NSW) 

1828 births
1900 deaths
Engineers from Glasgow
Members of the New Zealand House of Representatives
New Zealand engineers
New Zealand Roman Catholics
Australian Roman Catholics
Scottish emigrants to New Zealand
New Zealand people of Irish descent
New Zealand philanthropists
Australian philanthropists
Scottish people of Irish descent
Scottish philanthropists
Scottish civil engineers
Scottish inventors
Scottish Roman Catholics
Alumni of the University of Glasgow
Scottish soldiers
Volunteer Force officers
New Zealand MPs for North Island electorates
19th-century New Zealand politicians
19th-century New Zealand engineers
19th-century British philanthropists
Milton, New Zealand